Empty chair may refer to:

 Empty chair (law), a non-party to a lawsuit
 Empty chair crisis, a 1966 diplomatic crisis involving Charles de Gaulle
 Empty chair debating, a political technique involving a feigned lecturing of or debate with an absent person 
 Empty-chair technique used in Gestalt therapy
 The Empty Chair (novel), a crime novel by Jeffery Deaver
 "The Empty Chair" (song), a song by Sting
 "Empty chair speech", see Clint Eastwood at the 2012 Republican National Convention